John W. Thomas (March 31, 1846March 8, 1925) was a Welsh American immigrant, dairy farmer, and progressive Republican politician.  He was the 8th Wisconsin railroad commissioner—at the time a statewide elected office.  He also served four years in the Wisconsin State Senate (1909–1912) and eight years in the State Assembly (1895–1902), representing Chippewa County.

Early life and war service
Thomas was born on March 31, 1846, in Wales.  At age 3, he emigrated to the United States with his parents.  They settled in Tioga County, Pennsylvania, but he was orphaned at age 7.  From then, he lived with a family of neighbors, and, at age 11, he accompanied that family west to Chippewa County, Wisconsin.  They settled in the town of Anson, Wisconsin, where he was educated in the common schools.

Just before his 18th birthday, he volunteered for service in the Union Army, in the 4th year of the American Civil War.  He was enrolled as a private in Company K in the newly-organized 36th Wisconsin Infantry Regiment, and served with that regiment through the end of the war.  The 36th Wisconsin Infantry mustered into federal service in March 1864 and went immediately to the eastern theater of the war.  They arrived in time to join Grant's Overland Campaign, which would grind through Virginia over the Spring of 1864, and would spend the next year in the trenches in the Siege of Petersburg.  They then participated in the Appomattox campaign which culminated in Lee's surrender.  

Thomas returned to Anson after the war and settled a farm, where he maintained a herd of dairy cows, producing award-winning butter products.

Political career
Thomas became deeply involved in local politics in Anson; he was elected town clerk for seven years, was secretary of the school board for three years, was town treasurer for four years, and was a member of the town board for nine years, serving seven years as chairman.  He was also elected to the Chippewa County board of supervisors, was chairman for two years, and was elected to one term as county treasurer in 1884.  

He was also active in the Chippewa County Agricultural Society, was secretary for eight years, and was president in 1883.  He was also a director of the Eagle Point Insurance Company for more than 20 years, and was treasurer of the company for two years.  He was appointed to the State Board of Agriculture in 1897, and reappointed in 1899.

He was elected to his first state office in 1894, when he ran for Wisconsin State Assembly in Chippewa County's 2nd Assembly district.  The 2nd district comprised almost all of the county, except for the more densely-populated southwest corner.  He was re-elected in 1896, 1898, and 1900.  During his years in the Assembly, he was always a member of the committee on railroads and was chairman during the 1899 and 1901 sessions.  

In 1902, rather than running for another term in the Assembly, he was the Republican nominee for state railroad commissioner.  He won the 1902 election with 53% of the vote in a five-way race.  He went on to win re-election in 1904.  During the 1905 Wisconsin legislative session, the Legislature decided to abolish the position of railroad commissioner and replace it with a board of commissioners appointed by the governor.  

In the 1906 election, Thomas sought the Republican nomination for State Treasurer of Wisconsin, but he lost the Republican primary to Andrew H. Dahl.

In 1908, Thomas returned to elected office when he was elected to the Wisconsin State Senate in the 24th State Senate district—then-comprising all of Chippewa, Eau Claire, and Gates counties.  He did not run for another term in 1912 and never held another elected office, but remained active for much of the rest of his life supporting Republican candidates and attending Republican conventions.

Personal life and family
John W. Thomas married Marcella Fuller in 1868.  They had five children together, though three died in infancy and a fourth child died young.  

John Thomas died in Chippewa Falls on March 8, 1925.  He was survived by his wife and one daughter.

Electoral history

Wisconsin Railroad Commissioner (1902, 1904)

| colspan="6" style="text-align:center;background-color: #e9e9e9;"| General Election, November 4, 1902

| colspan="6" style="text-align:center;background-color: #e9e9e9;"| General Election, November 8, 1904

Wisconsin Treasurer (1906)

| colspan="6" style="text-align:center;background-color: #e9e9e9;"| Republican Primary, September 4, 1906

Wisconsin Senate (1908)

| colspan="6" style="text-align:center;background-color: #e9e9e9;"| General Election, November 3, 1908

References

External links

The Political Graveyard

|-

|-

1846 births
1925 deaths
Welsh emigrants to the United States
Politicians from Chippewa Falls, Wisconsin
People of Wisconsin in the American Civil War
Union Army soldiers
County supervisors in Wisconsin
County treasurers in Wisconsin
Republican Party members of the Wisconsin State Assembly
State cabinet secretaries of Wisconsin
Wisconsin state senators